R. P. Diengdoh, AC was an Indian police officer with the  Meghalaya Police who was posthumously awarded India's highest peace time gallantry award Ashoka Chakra.

Early life
Raymond P. Diengdoh was born in Lum-Batgen, East Khasi Hills, Shillong on 10 October 1975. His father's name was Philip Basaiwmoit. He was selected as a Deputy Superintendent in Meghalaya Police in 2004 batch.

Gallant act
On 7 November 2007, he led an operation to eliminate militants from the Meghalayan jungles. In the process, he killed one militant and helped capture two, but sustained gunshot wounds and later succumbed to his injuries. For his bravery, he was posthumously awarded the Ashoka Chakra, the highest peace time military decoration in India.

Ashoka Chakra awardee
The President of India noted in the Ashoka Chakra citation that Diengdoh displayed exemplary dedication to duty and pre-eminent valour in making the supreme sacrifice while fighting the militants.

References

2007 deaths
Recipients of the Ashoka Chakra (military decoration)
Ashoka Chakra
1975 births